Infrastructure Australia is an independent statutory body providing independent research and advice to all levels of government and industry on projects and reforms relating to investment in Australian infrastructure. It advocates for reforms on issues including financing, delivering and operating infrastructure and how to better plan and use Australia's infrastructure networks.

Infrastructure Australia also maintains the Infrastructure Priority List.
This is a prioritisation process that is intended to ensure that there is a single pipeline for the evaluation and prioritisation of nationally-significant infrastructure projects.

Governance
Infrastructure Australia was established in July 2008 to provide advice to the Australian Government under the Infrastructure Australia Act 2008.
In 2014, the Infrastructure Australia Act 2008 was amended to give Infrastructure Australia new powers, and to create an independent board with the right to appoint its own Chief Executive Officer. The amended Act came into effect on 1 September 2014.

The new Infrastructure Australia Board was formed in September 2014. Mark Birrell retired from his role as Chairman of Infrastructure Australia in August 2017, and Julieanne Alroe was appointed to the position in September 2017. Alroe and the 12 members brought experience from business, academia, the public and private sectors.   In January 2019, Romilly Madew was appointed as CEO.

The authority is part of the Department of Infrastructure, Transport, Regional Development and Communications, and Michael McCormack, has been the responsible minister since February 2018.

See also

Transport in Australia

References

Sources 
Simon Benson $60bn Infrastructure Wishlist to Save our Cities The Australian, February 25, 2017.
Jenny Wiggins Infrastructure Australia says tax land not property to capture value. The Australian Financial Review, December 14, 2016.
Article
Article

External links 
 

Commonwealth Government agencies of Australia
Transport in Australia
2008 establishments in Australia
Government agencies established in 2008